Mexican sunflower is a common name for several plants and may refer to:

 Tithonia diversifolia
 Tithonia rotundifolia